Two ships of the Bangladesh Navy carried the name BNS Shaheed Ruhul Amin:
 , an ex-Canadian coastal passenger-cargo vessel named Anticosti acquired in 1974.
 , an  patrol craft currently in service. Used as a training ship.

References

Bangladesh Navy ship names